Karina Mary Butler is an Irish professor of paediatrics and chair of Ireland's National Immunisation Advisory Committee (NIAC).

Background
Butler graduated with a degree in medicine from University College Dublin (UCD) in 1978. She became a Fellow of the Royal College of Physicians of Ireland in 1996.

Career
Butler is a specialist consultant in paediatrics and infectious disease at Children's Health Ireland at Temple Street and Children's Health Ireland at Crumlin. She is a Clinical Professor in Paediatrics at UCD.

Butler is the chair of NIAC and since January 2021 sits on the National Public Health Emergency Team (NPHET).

References

Year of birth missing (living people)
Living people
Irish women academics
Irish women medical doctors
Alumni of University College Dublin
Fellows of the Royal College of Physicians of Ireland
Irish infectious disease physicians
Irish pediatricians